George William Athol Sharp (1 April 1894 – 19 April 1969) was an Australian rules footballer who played with Carlton in the Victorian Football League (VFL).

Sharp, a forward, was recruited by Carlton from Moonee Ponds. He missed out on playing in Carlton's 1914 premiership team through injury but was a forward pocket and second rover in their 1915 VFL Grand Final winning side. In 1916 he missed another grand final, with a broken collarbone, but Carlton would lose on that occasion.

He served his country during the war and then returned to Carlton for one final season in 1920.

References

1894 births
Australian rules footballers from Victoria (Australia)
Carlton Football Club players
Carlton Football Club Premiership players
1969 deaths
One-time VFL/AFL Premiership players